Siah Goleh (also Romanized as Sīāh Goleh, Seyāh Geleh, and Sīāh Geleh; also known as Sīāhgileh and Siyahgella) is a village in Chaharduli Rural District, in the Central District of Asadabad County, Hamadan Province, Iran. At the 2006 census, its population was 284, in 61 families.

References 

Populated places in Asadabad County